Nils Winter (born 27 March 1977 in Buxtehude) is a German long jumper.

He finished seventh at the 2005 European Indoor Athletics Championships and the 2007 European Indoor Athletics Championships. Before this he had competed at the 2003 World Championships, 2004 World Indoor Championships and the 2004 Summer Olympics without reaching the finals.

His personal best jump is 8.21 metres, achieved in June 2005 in Bad Langensalza. This ranks him tenth among German long jumpers, behind Lutz Dombrowski, Frank Paschek, Josef Schwarz, Henry Lauterbach, Marco Delonge, Konstantin Krause, Dietmar Haaf, Ron Beer and Uwe Lange, and equal to Georg Ackermann and Christian Thomas.

Competition record

References 

 

1977 births
Living people
German male long jumpers
German national athletics champions
Athletes (track and field) at the 2004 Summer Olympics
Olympic athletes of Germany
People from Buxtehude
Sportspeople from Lower Saxony